Ben Arda (13 June 1929 – 20 December 2006) was a Filipino professional golfer.

Arda, known as Bantam Ben and the Toy Tiger because of his small stature, was one of Asia's leading golfers during the 1960s and 1970s. He was the first Filipino to qualify for the Masters Tournament and The Open Championship. He won nine tournaments on the Asia Golf Circuit, including the Philippine Open three times, and headed the points list in 1970. He also won four times on the Japan Golf Tour and played in the World Cup 16 times, recording a best finish of 2nd place in 1977 with playing partner Rudy Lavares.

Professional wins (15)

Japan Golf Tour wins (4)

1Co-sanctioned by the Asia Golf Circuit

Asia Golf Circuit wins (9)
1963 Philippine Open
1967 Singapore Open
1970 Malaysian Open
1973 Singapore Open
1974 Indonesia Open
1976 Thailand Open, Sobu International Open (also a Japan Golf Tour event)
1977 Dunlop International Open (also a Japan Golf Tour event)
1979 Philippine Open

Other wins
This list may be incomplete
1961 Philippine Open
1969 Indian Open
1976 Philippine Masters
1977 Philippine Masters

Results in major championships

CUT = missed the half-way cut (3rd round cut in 1972 Open Championship)
Note: Arda never played in the U.S. Open or the PGA Championship.

Team appearances
This list is incomplete
World Cup (representing the Philippines): 1956, 1958, 1960, 1961, 1962, 1963, 1964, 1965, 1966, 1967, 1969, 1970, 1971, 1972, 1975, 1977

References

External links

Filipino male golfers
Asian Tour golfers
Japan Golf Tour golfers
Sportspeople from Cebu
Cebuano people
1929 births
2006 deaths
Philippine Sports Hall of Fame inductees